Lauren Laniece Lake (born July 12, 1969) is an American family lawyer, television judge, and talk show presenter.

Lake has performed in guest hosting and news anchoring positions for various talk shows and reality legal programs. In much of her guest hosting, she has discussed controversial racial, ethnic, gender, and political issues. She was the host of HGTV's how-to series “Spice Up My Kitchen“.

Lake is best known for arbitrating as the presiding judge over her own tabloid talk/nontraditional courtroom series, Lauren Lake's Paternity Court. The series ran 7 seasons, and was nominated for a Daytime Emmy Award five times, including a win in 2019. Lake will return to courtroom programming, taking over the revival of We the People in her own edition We the People with Judge Lauren Lake. The series will return in the fall 2022, produced by Byron Allen's Entertainment Studios.

Early life and education

Lake was born in Detroit, Michigan to parents who had "very particular expectations" for their daughter's future; in her words, "These were Black people who fought their way through, one Ph.D. at a time, so they were big on education."

Growing up, Lake sang, danced, and acted in plays. Her parents agreed to allow this as long as she kept up with her studies. Lake attended Mercy High School in Farmington Hills, Michigan, and was honored as a National Merit Scholar in 1986.

In May 1990, Lake earned a Bachelor of Arts degree in English from the University of Michigan in Ann Arbor, Michigan. She earned a secondary teacher certification that same year. In May 1993, Lake earned a Juris Doctor from Wayne State University Law School in Detroit, Michigan. She paid for her college education by singing on the weekends.

In June 1995, she was admitted to the State Bar of Michigan and began her law career as a criminal defense attorney. In June 2002, she was admitted to the New York State Bar Association and the New Jersey State Bar Association, where her practice is predominantly devoted to entertainment and family law. Lake began designing professionally after graduating from law school.

Entertainment industry

Music industry

In 1999, Lake relocated to New York City, determined to establish herself as an entertainer. She immediately began working, singing background for multi-platinum selling artists, such as Mary J. Blige, Sean "Puff Daddy" Combs, Jay-Z, Dr. Dre, and Snoop Dogg. Lake began writing and recording her own music and performing throughout the New York metropolitan area. She eventually created her own production company.

Television industry
Lake appeared on  To Live and Date in New York, which chronicled the dating lives of independent and single New York women. The series was aired nationally on Women's Entertainment Channel as "Single in the City." Lake served as a correspondent, expert and life coach on The Greg Behrendt Show and as a legal and relationship expert and life coach on The Ricki Lake Show, for two seasons. She also served in various other capacities on The Ricki Lake Show, including field correspondent, makeover specialist, and a judge.

She has made regular guest appearances on Dr. Phil and The View as a legal expert. Lake has also appeared on The Today Show, The O'Reilly Factor, The Bill Cunningham Show, Regis & Kelly, Montel Williams, and The Morning Show with Mike and Juliet. Lake has served as a guest host/anchor and legal analyst for MSNBC and TruTV. Since 2005, Lake has been a regular on-air commentator for various news programs on CNN, Headline News, Fox News Channel, and CNBC. She was also featured in an episode of Modern Hero in 2017.

Lake is also a regular contributor to Black Entertainment Television's Meet the Faith and My Two Cents. She has participated in TLC shows such as While You Were Out and Trading Spaces. Between May 2007 through 2009, Lake hosted 47 episodes of HGTV's how-to show Spice Up My Kitchen. Lake has acknowledged her lack of formal design training, ironically, as an asset. She believes the lack of training experience allows her to think outside the box.

Lake presided over her own tabloid talk/courtroom series, Lauren Lake's Paternity Court, which began on September 23, 2013, and was produced by MGM Television. and ran for 7 seasons through February 22, 2021. Lake heard and decided paternity cases and rendered DNA test results. The series was canceled in the wake of COVID-19 related financial struggles with its network, MGM.

In June 2021, Entertainment Studios ordered a revival of the daily court show We the People with Lake taking over for Gloria Allred. The program is slated for a fall 2022 airing.

Radio industry

Lake has frequently participated as a guest legal expert on Power 105.1 FM. She has also been a regular guest on the Tom Joyner Morning Show and Michael Baisden radio show. She has been a guest on WBLS New York, and guest on-air host for Radio One's WDBZ in Cincinnati.

Other projects

Writing

Lake wrote her first book, "Girl! Let Me Tell You...," published in 2009. In the book, Lake answers questions about life and love, posed by single successful women. The book deals with everything from men, dating and relationships to expectations, feelings of loneliness, and the pursuit of dreams.

Motivational speaking

She regularly travels the country motivating others to pursue their passions and get the most out of life through motivational speeches and seminars. Lake launches the Limitless Living Empowerment Tour in January.

After witnessing Lake advocating dynamically for victims of Hurricane Katrina, comedian and activist Dr. Bill Cosby selected Lake as a motivational speaker on his nationwide Call Out tour: a tour which reaches out to encourage and uplift inner city communities. Lake is also featured in Cosby's book Come on, People: On the Path from Victims to Victor.

Organizations

From 1999 to 2002, Lake was the vice president of DS Recordings Inc., where she discovered, signed, and developed new talent. Since September 2000, Lake has also been the co-owner of L Style Design Studios, LLC, in Fort Lee, N.J. In this forum, she provides full scale interior design services for clients, including updates, renovations, construction, and general contracting.

Since 2006, Lake has run the Law Offices of Lauren Lake, located in New York City, Saddlebrook, New Jersey, and Southfield, Michigan. In this forum, she acts as the sole practitioner, responsible for establishing and maintaining client relationships. She represents clients in civil and criminal matters, including divorce, child custody and support, and paternity. Further, she has handled felony and misdemeanor trials, involving arson, criminal sexual conduct, theft, weapons, assault, and possession of controlled substances. She is a member of The Metropolitan Bar Association, Association of Black Women Lawyers, and Black Entertainment and Sports Lawyers Association. Lake is the co-founder of the Women in Entertainment Empowerment Network (WEEN) which promotes the positive portrayal of women in entertainment and society.

References 

1969 births
Living people
Writers from Detroit
People from Fort Lee, New Jersey
Writers from Hackensack, New Jersey
Writers from New York City
Wayne State University alumni
University of Michigan College of Literature, Science, and the Arts alumni
African-American television personalities
American television talk show hosts
Participants in American reality television series
20th-century African-American women singers
People from Oak Park, Michigan
African-American lawyers
American lawyers
African-American women writers
American women television personalities
21st-century African-American women
21st-century African-American people
American women lawyers